The Republican Socialist Unity Party (Spanish: Partido de la Unión Republicana Socialista, PURS) was a political party founded on 10 November 1946 in Bolivia as the fusion of the Republican Socialist Party, the Genuine Republican Party, the United Socialist Party, and the Independent Socialist Party.

Despite its socialist-sounding name, the PURS was actually a conservative party. It represented a last-ditch effort of Bolivia's traditional political establishment to oppose the forces of mass-based populism and of socialism represented by the Revolutionary Nationalist Movement (MNR).

Led by Enrique Hertzog Garaizabal, Francisco Lazcano Soruca, Waldo Belmonte Pool, and Mamerto Urriolagoitía Harriague, the Republican Socialist Unity Party attempted particularly to revive the position and popularity of the old Saavedristas wing of the Republican Party. PURS favored anticommunism, ample room for free enterprise, and antifascism, primarily interpreted as opposition to the MNR.

The Republican Socialist Unity Party participated in the 1947 and 1951 general elections. Hertzog was elected President of the Republic in 1947, with Urriolagoitía as his vice-president; and the latter succeeded to the presidency when Hertzog resigned because of ill health.

In the 1951 elections, Gabriel Gosalvez ran for the PURS but received far fewer votes than the winner, Víctor Paz Estenssoro.
PURS supported the military takeover which followed the elections, in order to prevent Paz from becoming president on the basis of his popular plurality.

The PURS would never come close to taking power again. It nominally continued to exist through the early 1970s, but largely became inactive after 1952.

For the 1966 elections, the PURS was a component of the Democratic Institutionalist Alliance, with Hertzog as the coalition's presidential candidate. He polled 11,400 votes (01.13%) and came sixth.

In 1978 PURS allied with the Nationalist Union of the People and its candidate Juan Pereda.

Notes

Defunct political parties in Bolivia
Political parties established in 1946
Anti-communist parties
1946 establishments in Bolivia